Eureka Stadium, known commercially as Mars Stadium, is an oval shaped sports stadium located in the Eureka Sports Precinct of Wendouree,  north of the CBD of the city of Ballarat, Victoria, Australia.

History
The first permanent oval used by the North Ballarat Football Club was established in 1963 in the centre of the Ballarat Showgrounds show-ring and Harness Racing track that was used by the Ballarat Trotting Club as its main venue between 1952 and 1966. In 1990 a new large all-weather oval (dimensions ) replaced the old harness racing track. The new oval was complemented by a new sports pavilion (The North Ballarat Sports Club) which was constructed on private land to the oval's northern flank.

Between 1990 and 2015 the oval was used for many sporting and entertainment purposes although mainly as an Australian rules football and cricket venue. It annually hosted the Ballarat Gift (Athletics Carnival) and the Ballarat Agricultural and Pastoral Society's show-ring events during their annual Show. During this time the North Ballarat Sports Club underwent a number of expansions and upgrades.

Throughout the 1990s and early 2000s various proposals to play AFL football at the ground had been discussed by the Ballarat football community, media, and business groups in isolation. However, in 2008 a  proposal to develop the stadium for use by AFL team North Melbourne and the North Ballarat VFL team was put forward to the Victorian State Government by the Ballarat Council backed by business and civic groups under a campaign titled "Think Big Ballarat". The proposal received support from the Labor Government during the 2010 State Election, however when not returned to office the new incoming LNP Government gave only conditional support to the proposal finally dropping it in 2011. The Ballarat Council, media, sports groups, tourism and business groups continued lobbying until the 2014 State election when the then State Opposition announced that they would fund the development as an AFL Tier 2 stadium with the first AFL seasonal game to be played from 2017 if elected. Once elected, the new government immediately committed funding in the 2015 State Budget thus green lighting the first stage development of the stadium.

In order to accommodate grandstands and other facilities the oval was completely rebuilt being oriented to a NE-SW axis in preparation for the first stage of construction. The newly rebuilt oval featured state of the art irrigation and drainage systems, a 4000 capacity spectator berm on its South-Eastern flank, and four  light towers rigged to illuminate the playing arena to 300 lux (sufficient for non-televised Tier 2 Australian Football night competition).

In June 2017 naming rights for the venue were granted to Mars Confectionery Australia. From April 2017 to June 2018 the City of Ballarat and North Ballarat Sports Club negotiated for Council to purchase the freehold title to ensure that the newly built stadium and existing sports club would be co-developed and future managed as a singular entity.

The facility today remains the home of the North Ballarat Sports Club including the Greater Western Victoria Rebels of the NAB League and the North Ballarat City FC of the Ballarat Football League. It is also used as a venue for Central Highlands Football League and Ballarat Football League for both seasonal games and finals in addition to hosting two AFL seasonal games per-year since 2017.

Sports played at Eureka Stadium

Australian rules football
In 2006 professional football club North Melbourne established a partnership with the North Ballarat Football Club to enable its reserve-grade players to play alongside the North Ballarat players in the Victorian Football League. North Melbourne also played pre-season games in the Australian Football League (AFL) at the ground during this time. In 2014 the Victorian Government and AFL approved the request of fellow AFL club the Western Bulldogs at least two AFL premiership matches at the ground from 2017, though without an affiliation with North Ballarat as North Melbourne had been. At that point North Melbourne ceased its association with Ballarat and instead committed to play a percentage of their AFL premiership matches in Hobart, Tasmania.

In August 2017, the Bulldogs hosted the first AFL match for premiership points at the venue against  with the latter winning the match by 17 points. The Bulldogs have also played pre-season and regular season AFL men's and AFL Women's games at the ground. In November 2021 the Western Bulldogs and the Ballarat Council announced that the club would continue playing two AFL and one AFLW home games per season, to be reviewed in 2024.

In July 2021 the stadium hosted the Round 17 AFL match between the GWS Giants and the Gold Coast Suns that was originally scheduled to be held in Sydney when a COVID-19 outbreak in New South Wales necessitated a last-minute change of venue.

Association football
Since 2019 the stadium has hosted association football (soccer) with A-League club Western United FC playing some of its Victorian home games in Ballarat. The first game was played against Wellington Phoenix on 28 December 2019 with the Phoenix winning the match 3–1 in front of 5,084 fans. Since 2019 the club has continued to utilise the venue for some home season games and has further committed to do so until construction of a new dedicated home soccer stadium in Tarneit in Western Melbourne is completed. In October 2020 A-League Players voted the stadium as having equal to or the best surface of all A-League venues.

Cricket
From 1990 to 2015 the main oval hosted Ballarat Cricket Association matches. The individual highest batting score on the ground (226 runs) being accredited to Mr Tom MacDonald (of the Wendouree Cricket Club) on the 18th February 2006 against the North Ballarat Cricket Club. The main oval has not been used for cricket since redevelopment in 2016, however provision was made for drop in wickets to be installed if the venue hosts future large scale cricket events. The Ballarat North Cricket Club currently play home matches at the Frank Bourke Oval (Also referred to as the Number 2 Oval) adjacent to the stadium, while First Class cricket matches in Ballarat are mostly hosted at the city's historic Eastern Oval which has recently undergone a series of Cricket Australia endorsed upgrades.

Rugby union and rugby league
The stadium successfully hosted Melbourne Rebels Super Rugby AU pre-seasonal and seasonal games against Queensland Reds and the Durban Sharks during 2019 and 2020 respectively, and Melbourne Storm and Newcastle Knights of the Australian National Rugby League in February 2022 in a pre-season trial game before 5,127 fans.

Redevelopments in the 2010s
In 2015 the Ballarat Council prepared a strategic development document titled the "Ballarat Major Events Precinct Master Plan" that detailed a long-term plan for a three-stage development of the Eureka Sports Precinct which included Eureka Stadium, the Ballarat Showgrounds, neighbouring sports ovals, netball courts and pavilions as well as the construction of the Ballarat Sports Events Centre.

In June 2015 the Victorian government committed $38.5 million to upgrade the wider Eureka Sports Precinct, with approximately half of the funding allocated to Stage-One development of the Eureka Stadium.

Planning for construction of the first stage was significantly fast-tracked, occurring whilst the reconstruction of the oval was underway during 2015. Initial design concepts for the grandstands were released for public feedback in late 2015 resulting in significant revisions before the final designs were confirmed in May 2016. Soon after tenders for construction were announced, the building works for new grandstand and terraced seating for 5000, player races, a video scoreboard, new coaches boxes and media broadcast suites had commenced. Those construction works being completed by July 2017.

In May 2018 the Victorian State Government commissioned a $500,000 Ballarat Council study to identify works considered necessary to immediately address the facility's known shortcomings as well as long-term development options. The recommendations were delivered to the State Government and informed the Victorian State Government's "Home Ground Advantage - Victoria's Major Stadia Strategy" document.

From September 2020 to April 2022 a $6.6 million works program provided upgraded player and umpire change-rooms as uni-sex facilities, two new permanent covered entrances and ticketing facilities, new food and beverage outlets, permanent public conveniences at the southern boundary of the stadium, and partial concreting of the south-east viewing berm. These works were completed under budget ($6.35 million) in March 2022.

Since 2018 various sports users and television sports commentators have publicly criticised the stadium's 2016 lighting upgrade noting its ineffectiveness during twilight and inclement weather conditions. In January 2022 the Ballarat Council lobbyied for replacement of the stadium's lighting with modern TV broadcast standard towers under a $3.5 million request to  political parties ahead of 2022 Federal and State elections.

2026 Commonwealth Games
On 12 April 2022, the Premier of Victoria announced that the stadium will be expanded and upgraded to host the athletics events at the 2026 Commonwealth Games. The initial announcement did not address specific details of funding or the nature of the upgrade.

With the Games announcement, the Ballarat Council commenced negotiations for the purchase of two Freehold Title properties to the North and South of the Stadium. This additional land would initially be used to support expansion of sporting and entertainment zones during the games and later for creation of sports fields and stadia after the games. At the same time the 2015 precinct Master Plan was revised to advise Commonwealth Games planners of the City's expectations and aspirations thus ensuring that any Commonwealth Games development would support the long term development of the precinct and leave a strong positive legacy after the Games.

In October 2022, the Games Organisers announced that $150 million would be spent to upgrade the stadium and for its reconfiguration after the Games. State Government released tenders on 4 November 2022  to permanently expand the existing Eastern Stand from 1,000 to 3,000 capacity, and for a new permanent 3,000 seat stand to be built immediately South of the Eastern Stand. Initially no roofs to be installed on either of the two stands. During the Games some 18,000 temporary seats will be erected around the Eastern and Southern boundaries of the Stadium facilitating the temporary removal of existing scoreboard and amenities block. After the Games the temporary stands will be removed and permanent roofs will be built over the remaining permanent sections of the Eastern and Southern Stands. At the same time the Southern amenities blocks and scoreboard to be re-instated.

Presently no information regarding the nature of permanent lighting upgrades or how the Southern standing boundary will be re-configured after the Games has been released, however these details are likely to be provided once final plans of the stadium's upgrade are released in early 2024. Further, no information has been released in relation to whether a new railway platform is to be built in the vicinity of the stadium, or any announcement regarding the widening of the adjacent Midland Highway, as railway and road upgrades are beyond the remit of the Games Organisers. The Tender calls for construction and development works to commence in the Stadium precinct from October 2023.

The October 2022 tender confirmed that a new international standard competition athletics track (to be used as a training and warm up track during the games) will be built on the site of the existing Ballarat Showgrounds which are due to close in November 2023. This new athletics centre will replace Ballarat's ageing main athletics competition and training facility Llanberris Reserve at Golden Point.

Attendance records
Top 5 Attendance Records

References

External links

Ballarat Major Events Precinct Masterplan Final Report

Australian Football League grounds
Victorian Football League grounds
Sports venues in Victoria (Australia)
Buildings and structures in Ballarat
Sport in Ballarat
Proposed sports venues in Australia